Ingvald Svinsås-Lo (26 December 1897 – 1 June 1980) was a Norwegian politician for the Liberal Party.

He was elected to the Norwegian Parliament from Sør-Trøndelag in 1945, but was not re-elected in 1949.

Born in Meldal, Svinsås-Lo was a member of Meldal municipal council from 1928 to 1959, except for the years 1940 to 1945 during the German occupation of Norway, serving as mayor during the term 1934–1937. He chaired the countywide party chapter from 1938 to 1952.

Outside politics, he worked as a farmer.

References

1897 births
1980 deaths
People from Meldal
Members of the Storting
Liberal Party (Norway) politicians
Mayors of places in Sør-Trøndelag
20th-century Norwegian politicians